Carl Edwards (born 14 September 1963) is a British equestrian. He competed in two events at the 2000 Summer Olympics.

References

External links
 

1963 births
Living people
British male equestrians
Olympic equestrians of Great Britain
Equestrians at the 2000 Summer Olympics
Place of birth missing (living people)